Balcha (Amharic: ባልቻ) is a male name of Ethiopian origin that may refer to:

Balcha Safo (1863–1936), Ethiopian general in the Italo-Ethiopian Wars
Kebede Balcha (born 1951), Ethiopian marathon runner
Kassa Balcha (born 1955), Ethiopia cross country runner

See also
Balcha (wasp)

Amharic-language names